The 1956 Monaco Grand Prix was a Formula One motor race held on 13 May 1956 at Monaco. It was race 2 of  8 in the 1956 World Championship of Drivers.

The Owen's BRM made their first appearance but after qualifying both cars were withdrawn due to engine valve problems. The other two non-starters were the too-slow Scarlatti and Chiron due to his engine blowing up in practice.

Moss, starting from the middle of the front row, took the lead at Gasworks on the first lap and led every lap. Fangio was not having a good day. He hit the straw bales on lap 2, causing Schell and Musso to retire when trying to avoid him, and on lap 32 he hit the harbour wall, bending a rear wheel. He turned the car over to Castellotti after the pit stop to fix the wheel. On lap 54 while second, Collins came in the pit and turned his car over to Fangio. He resumed in third and passed Behra for second on lap 70, but he was 47 seconds behind Moss. On lap 86 Perdisa's brakes locked when being lapped by Moss, the resulting contact caused Moss's bonnet to lift allowing Fangio to close the gap by two seconds each lap but Moss won with a 6-second cushion.

Classification

Qualifying 

Note: Both BRM cars (Mike Hawthorn and Tony Brooks) withdrew after qualifying due to engine issues.

Race

Notes
 – Includes 1 point for fastest lap
 – Fangio scored no points for fourth place as he had already scored points for finishing second

Shared drives
 Car #26: Peter Collins (54 laps) and Juan Manuel Fangio (46 laps). They shared the 6 points for second place (Fangio also scored an extra point for achieving fastest lap).
 Car #20: Juan Manuel Fangio (40 laps) and Eugenio Castellotti (54 laps). Since Fangio received points for second, only Castellotti received the 1.5 points for the shared fourth.
 Car #4: Élie Bayol (44 laps) and André Pilette (44 laps).

Championship standings after the race 
Drivers' Championship standings

Note: Only the top five positions are included.

References

Monaco Grand Prix
Monaco Grand Prix
Grand Prix
Monaco Grand Prix